Pushpagiri Wildlife Sanctuary is one of the 21 Wildlife Sanctuaries in Karnataka, India.

This sanctuary is located in Somwarpet taluk of the Kodagu district.  It is home to rare and endangered birdlife. The Kadamakkal reserve forest is a part of the sanctuary. Pushpagiri (Kumara Parvatha) is the highest peak in it. The sanctuary adjoins Bisle reserve forest to the north and Kukke Subramanya forest range to the west.

Mandalpatti peak, Kote betta and Makkalagudi betta are mountains fall in the sanctuary. Mallalli falls and Kote abbe waterfalls (also called as Mukkodlu falls) are located inside the sanctuary. The Pushpagiri Wildlife Sancutuary has been proposed as one of the World Heritage Site.

References

External links

 Western Ghats UNESCO World Heritage Centre
 Important Bird Areas in India - Pushpagiri Wildlife Sanctuary

1987 establishments in Karnataka
North Western Ghats montane rain forests
Wildlife sanctuaries of the Western Ghats
South Western Ghats montane rain forests
Tourist attractions in Kodagu district
Wildlife sanctuaries in Karnataka